Kurt G. Alme is an American attorney who served as the United States attorney for the District of Montana from 2017 to 2020. After stepping down as U.S. Attorney in December 2020, Alme became the budget director in the administration of Montana's Governor-elect Greg Gianforte.

Early life and education
Alme was born in Great Falls, Montana. After graduating from Custer County District High School, he earned a Bachelor of Science degree in business from the University of Colorado Boulder and a Juris Doctor from Harvard Law School.

Career
Alme served as a judicial law clerk for Charles C. Lovell of the United States District Court for the District of Montana. He was a partner with the law firm of Crowley, Haughey, Hanson, Toole & Dietrich, PLLP. From 2003 to 2010, Alme served in the U.S. Attorney's Office for the District of Montana, and was the first assistant United States attorney from 2006 to 2010. He also served as director of the Montana Department of Revenue.

Alme has served as president and general counsel of the Yellowstone Boys and Girls Ranch Foundation.

References

External links
 Biography at Department of Justice

Living people
Assistant United States Attorneys
Harvard Law School alumni
Montana lawyers
People from Miles City, Montana
United States Attorneys for the District of Montana
University of Colorado alumni
21st-century American lawyers
Year of birth missing (living people)